Erin Jacqueline Cuthbert (born 19 July 1998) is a Scottish footballer who plays for Chelsea in the FA WSL and is a member of the Scotland national team. She studied at University of the West of Scotland, combining graduation from the Open University with being a professional football player.

Club career

Scottish football
Cuthbert played for five years at Rangers, making her Scottish Women's Premier League debut in September 2013 and being named the league's Young Player of the Year for the 2014 season. She transferred to Glasgow City in January 2015 and was part of the City team that won the domestic treble in 2015 then retained the SWPL title in 2016, though lost in both cup finals to Hibernian.

Chelsea
On 8 December 2016, Cuthbert left Glasgow City to join FA WSL club Chelsea. On 19 March 2017, she made her debut for the Blues in a 7–0 win over Doncaster Rovers Belles in the fifth round of the Women's FA Cup. On 30 April 2017, she made her league debut and scored the team's fourth goal in a 6–0 home victory against Yeovil Town. She finished her first season with 4 goals and 2 assists in 7 appearances in all competitions. On 15 November 2017, Cuthbert made her UEFA Women's Champions League debut for the Blues in a 1–0 win over FC Rosengård. On 4 February 2018, she scored her first hat-trick for the club in a 10–0 victory against London Bees in the fourth round of the Women's FA Cup.

Cuthbert was nominated for the PFA Women's Players' Player of the Year award in the 2018–19 season. During that season, she scored in Champions League ties with Paris Saint-Germain and Lyon.

Cuthbert signed a new contract with Chelsea in November 2022, which is due to run until the end of the 2024–25 season.

International career
Cuthbert represented Scotland at school, under 15, under 17, and under 19 level. Cuthbert was selected for the full Scotland squad for Euro 2017 qualifiers against Iceland and Belarus in June 2016. She was selected in the Scotland squads for the UEFA Women's Euro 2017 and 2019 FIFA Women's World Cup final tournaments. At the 2019 World Cup, she scored for Scotland in the 3–3 draw with Argentina.

Career Statistics

Club

International goals
. Scotland score listed first, score column indicates score after each Cuthbert goal.

Honours

Club
Glasgow City
 SWPL: 2015, 2016
 SWPL Cup: 2015
 Scottish Women's Cup: 2015

Chelsea
 FA WSL: 2017, 2017–18, 2019–20, 2020–21 2021-22
 Women's FA Cup: 2017–18, 2020–21 2021-2022

 FA Women's League Cup: 2020–21
 FA Community Shield: 2020
UEFA Women's Champions League: Runner-up 2020–21

Individual
Scotland Player of the Year: 2019, 2021
 PFA WSL Team of the Year: 2018–19
Chelsea Player of the Year: 2019

References

External links 

 
Erin Cuthbert profile at Chelsea FC

1998 births
Living people
Scottish women's footballers
Footballers from Irvine, North Ayrshire
Scottish Women's Premier League players
Women's Super League players
Scotland women's international footballers
Glasgow City F.C. players
Rangers W.F.C. players
Chelsea F.C. Women players
Women's association football midfielders
2019 FIFA Women's World Cup players
Alumni of the University of the West of Scotland
UEFA Women's Euro 2017 players